Tronzano Vercellese  (Tronsan in Piedmontese) is a comune (municipality) in the Province of Vercelli in the Italian region Piedmont, located about  northeast of Turin and about  west of Vercelli.

Tronzano Vercellese borders the following municipalities: Alice Castello, Bianzè, Borgo d'Ale, Crova, Ronsecco, San Germano Vercellese, and Santhià.

Twin towns — sister cities
Tronzano Vercellese is twinned with:

  Eyguières, France

References